City Palace may refer to:
 City Palace, Berlin, Germany
 City Palace, Brunswick, Germany
 City Palace, Potsdam, Germany
 Wiesbaden City Palace, Germany
 Schloss Weimar, Germany
 City Palace, Jaipur, India
 City Palace, Udaipur, India
 Mysore Palace or City Palace, a palace in Mysore, India

See also
Residenz
Stadtschloss (disambiguation)